George Evans (27 June 1864 – 4 May 1947) was an English footballer. His regular position was as a forward. He played for Derby County, West Bromwich Albion and Manchester United.

External links
MUFCInfo.com profile

English footballers
Manchester United F.C. players
Derby County F.C. players
West Bromwich Albion F.C. players
1947 deaths
1864 births
Football Alliance players
Association football forwards
Footballers from Handsworth, West Midlands